Blood soup is any soup that uses blood as a principal ingredient.

List of blood soups

Examples of blood stew include:
 Black soup, a historical pork-blood soup of Ancient Greek cuisine particularly associated with ancient Sparta.
 Chicken and duck blood soup, a blood soup popular in Shanghai
 Chornaja Poliwka, Belarusian soup made of duck, goose or pig blood and clear broth
 Czernina, or Duck Blood Soup, a Polish soup made of duck, goose or pig blood and clear broth
 Dinuguan, a soup from the Philippines made of pig blood and pork offal or meat
 Duck blood and vermicelli soup, a traditional delicacy in Nanjing
 Fritada, a special type of dish cooked with goat (cabrito) blood, prepared in Northern Mexico, and a regional specialty in the city of Monterrey.
 Godlja, a traditional Slovenian blood soup 
 Juka, a Lithuanian blood soup from the Dzūkija region
 Mykyrokka, a traditional soup dish in Middle-Finland
 Prdelačka, a traditional Czech pork blood soup made during the pig slaughter season
 Saksang, a savory spicy dish from the Bataks of Indonesia made with pork or dog meat stewed in blood with coconut milk and spices
 Schwarzsauer, a German blood soup with various spices cooked in vinegar-water and a sort of black pudding made with vinegar.
 Seonjiguk, a Korean soup made with thick slices of congealed ox blood and vegetables in a hearty beef broth, known as a hangover cure
 Svartsoppa, a soup consumed in Scania with goose blood (or sometimes pig blood) as the main ingredient
 Tiết canh, a Vietnamese duck blood soup
 Yawarlukru, An Ecuadorian speciality from the highlands region

See also

 Black pudding
 Coq au vin
 List of soups

References

 
Blood dishes
Soup-related lists